The Vincennes Bridge Company, based in Vincennes, Indiana, was a designer and builder of bridges that was "one of Indiana's 'most successful bridge-building firms'".

It was founded by three schoolteachers in 1898.  The firm produced more than 1200 bridges per year by 1920.  The firm reincorporated as Vincennes Steel Company in 1932.  The Vincennes Steel Company ceased to exist by 2006, when its assets were folded into Wabash Steel, Inc.

A number of its works are listed on the U.S. National Register of Historic Places.

Works include (attribution):
Aqueduct Bridge, Towpath Road over Birch Creek, Clay City, Indiana (Vincennes Bridge Company), NRHP-listed
Cache River Bridge, a Parker pony truss that spans the Cache River between Walnut Ridge and Paragould, Arkansas. It was built in 1934. AR 25, over the Cache River, Walnut Ridge, Arkansas (Vincennes Bridge Co.), NRHP-listed
College Street Bridge, spans Barren River, Bowling Green, Kentucky (Vincennes Bridge Co.), NRHP-listed
Cordell Hull Bridge, Bridge Street over the Cumberland River, Carthage, Tennessee (Vincennes Steel Corporation), NRHP-listed
Hutsonville Bridge, IN 154 over the Wabash River, Hutsonville, Illinois, and Graysville, Indiana (Vincennes Steel Corporation)
Indiana State Highway Bridge 42-11-3101, IN 42 over Eel River, Poland, Indiana (Vincennes Bridge Company), NRHP-listed
Indiana State Highway Bridge 46-11-1316, IN 46 over Eel River, Bowling Green, Indiana (Vincennes Bridge Company), NRHP-listed
Jeffers Bridge, CR 200 S over Birch Creek, Clay City, Indiana (Vincennes Bridge Company), NRHP-listed
North Fork Bridge, AR 5 over North Fork River, Norfork, Arkansas (Vincennes Bridge Co.), NRHP-listed
Petit Jean River Bridge, County Road 49 over the Petit Jean River, Ola, Arkansas (Vincennes Bridge company), NRHP-listed
Secrest Ferry Bridge, County Road 450 E over the West Fork of the White River, Gosport, Indiana (Vincennes Bridge Co.), NRHP-listed
St. Francis River Bridge, AR 18, over the St. Francis River, Lake City, Arkansas (Vincennes Bridge Co.), NRHP-listed
US 67 Bridge over Little Missouri River, US 67, Prescott, Arkansas (Vincennes Bridge Co.), NRHP-listed

References

Interstate 95 Gold Star Memorial Bridge crossing the Thames River - New London, Connecticut

External links
Vincennes Bridge Co. at Bridgehunter.com

Bridge companies
Vincennes, Indiana
Companies based in Indiana
Construction and civil engineering companies of the United States
1898 establishments in Indiana
Construction and civil engineering companies established in 1898
American companies established in 1898